Terence Christopher Gerald Rigby (2 January 1937 – 10 August 2008) was an English actor with a number of film and television credits to his name. In the 1970s he was well known as police dog-handler PC Snow in the long-running series Softly, Softly: Task Force.

Early life
Terence Rigby was born in Erdington, Birmingham, and was educated at St Philip's School. He was trained at RADA and had his national service in the Royal Air Force.

Career
His film roles included Get Carter (1971), Watership Down (1978), Tomorrow Never Dies (1997), Elizabeth (1998), Mona Lisa Smile (2003) and Colour Me Kubrick (2006).

His notable television roles included Dixon of Dock Green, Softly, Softly: Taskforce; Z-Cars, The First Lady, Callan, The Saint, Public Eye, Edward & Mrs. Simpson, Tinker Tailor Soldier Spy; Airline, Rumpole of the Bailey, Boon, Lovejoy, Our Friends in the North, Born to Run, Holby City, Midsomer Murders, Crossroads, Kings Oak (playing the part of motel boss, Tommy Lancaster), The Beiderbecke Affair and The Beiderbecke Connection. He was also Dr Watson to Tom Baker's Sherlock Holmes in a BBC version of The Hound of the Baskervilles (1982).

Among his stage credits was the role of Joey in the original Peter Hall production of Harold Pinter's The Homecoming (1965), which he repeated on Broadway in 1967.  Hall later cast him as Briggs in the première of No Man's Land at the National Theatre in 1975, alongside John Gielgud and Ralph Richardson.  The production played on Broadway the following year.  In 1977, Rigby received considerable acclaim for his portrayal of Joseph Stalin in another National Theatre production, Robert Bolt's State of Revolution, opposite Michael Bryant's Lenin.  He returned twice more to Broadway, first in 1995, doubling as the Ghost, the Player King, and the Gravedigger in Jonathan Kent's Almeida production of Hamlet, starring Ralph Fiennes; and then again in 1999 as Count Orsini-Rosenberg in Peter Hall's production of Amadeus, starring David Suchet and Michael Sheen.

Segments from Rigby's abbreviated autobiography, begun shortly before his death, are included in the book by his long-time friend, the television and radio dramatist Juliet Ace, Rigby Shlept Here: A Memoir of Terence Rigby 1937–2008. Along with correspondence and interviews with his friends and theatrical colleagues, Ace's memoir draws on her own diaries and shows much of the working actor and private man who remained a mystery to those close to him. It was published in November, 2014.

Death
Rigby died at home in London on 10 August 2008 of lung cancer.

Partial filmography

 Accident (1967) – Plain Clothed Policeman
 Get Carter (1971) – Gerald Fletcher
 The Homecoming (1973) – Joey
 Watership Down (1978) – Silver (voice)
 Tinker Tailor Soldier Spy (1979, TV Mini-Series) – Roy Bland
 The Dogs of War (1980) – Hackett
 The Hound of the Baskervilles (1982, TV Mini-Series) - Dr. Watson
 Anyone for Denis? (1982, TV Movie) – Major
 The Sign of Four (1983, TV Movie) – Inspector Layton
 Testimony (1988) – Joseph Stalin
 Scandal (1989) – James Burge
 The Children (1990) – Duke of Mendip
 The Young Americans (1993) – Sidney Callow
 Funny Bones (1995) – Billy Man
 England, My England (1995) – Captain Henry Cooke
 Tomorrow Never Dies (1997) – General Bukharin
 Elizabeth (1998) – Bishop Stephen Gardiner
 Plunkett and Macleane (1999) – Harrison
 Simon Magus (1999) – Bratislav
 The Strange Case of Delphina Potocka of The Mystery of Chopin (1999) – Sydow
 Essex Boys (2000) – Henry Hobbs
 Mrs Caldicot's Cabbage War (2002) – Henry Caldicot
 Mona Lisa Smile (2003) – Dr. Edward Staunton
 Colour Me Kubrick (2006) – Norman
 Flick (2008) – Creeper Martin (final film role)

References

External links

BBC News, actor Terence Rigby has died
Terence Rigby website – now archived
Obituary in The Telegraph
Obituary in The Guardian
Obituary in The Times
Obituary in The Stage
Obituary in The Independent
Terence Rigby interview, Theatre Archive Project, British Library
 Rigby Shlept Here: A Memoir of Terence Rigby 1937–2008, Amazon, 2014, ASIN: B00Q25491I

1937 births
2008 deaths
People from Erdington
20th-century Royal Air Force personnel
Alumni of RADA
Deaths from lung cancer in England
English male film actors
English male television actors
English male voice actors
People educated at St Philip's School
People from Birmingham, West Midlands